Kevin J. McManus (born November 3, 1978 in Kansas City, Missouri) is an American attorney and politician from the state of Missouri.  He was elected to the Missouri House of Representatives in 2010 and was re-elected in 2012 and 2014.  In 2015, he was elected to the City Council of Kansas City, Missouri, where he presently serves.

References

External links
Official Missouri House of Representatives Profile
Kevin McManus, City Council Bio
Kevin McManus Campaign Website

1978 births
Living people
Members of the Missouri House of Representatives
Politicians from Kansas City, Missouri
Lawyers from Kansas City, Missouri
21st-century American politicians
Missouri city council members